Bud Wiener Park is an urban park located in Los Angeles City Council District 14, Los Angeles, California. It consists of a grassy play area stocked with benches and drinking fountains.

References

Parks in California
Parks in Los Angeles County, California
Parks in Los Angeles